Saint Flavitus (or Flaive) was a priest and hermit of the early Middle Ages. He was born in the mid-6th century in Lombardy. In 568, he was brought to the Champagne region of France as a prisoner of war, where his master made him intendant of his castle.

Upon being set free from him slavery, he was ordained priest by Saint Lupus at Sens, and retired to the solitude of Marcilly-le-Hayer, in the diocese of Troyes. He died on 18 December 630 and his relics are kept at the church of Sainte-Colombe in Sens. His feast is kept on 16 December.

References
 Holweck, F. G., A Biographical Dictionary of the Saints. 1924.

630 deaths
7th-century Frankish saints
Year of birth unknown
Medieval Italian saints
French hermits
Italian hermits
7th-century Italian clergy